The 2011 Canada Winter Games were held in Halifax, Nova Scotia, from Friday, 11 February 2011, to Sunday, 27 February 2011.

Bids
Four bids (all from Nova Scotia, as it was that province's turn) were made for the games, and eventually Halifax was selected to stage the games.
Halifax
Annapolis Valley
Truro, Wentworth and Brookfield with other communities.
Antigonish, Pictou, Guysborough and Port Hawkesbury

Wentworth was part of one of the losing bids, but did end up hosting the alpine skiing and freestyle skiing events at these games.

Medal table
The following is the medal table for the 2011 Canada Winter Games.

3 bronze medals were awarded in the freestyle skiing men's halfpipe.
2 golds and one bronze medal award in female all around in artistic gymnastics, no silver medal was awarded.
2 bronze medals awarded in women's artistic gymnastics balance beam and men's rings.
2 gold medals awarded in men's artistic gymnastics pommel horse and horizontal bar, no silver medals were awarded in either event.
No bronze and silver medals awarded in dance (solo) special Olympics Level II male and female figure skating.

Flag points/Centennial Cup
Ontario won the flag points competition, and Nova Scotia won the Centennial Cup.

Participating provinces and territories
All 13 provinces and territories competed.

 (242)
 (242)
 (224)
 (200)
 (97)
 (103) 
 (222) (hosts)
 (28)
 (260)
 (147)
 (254)
 (223)
 (107)

Sports

 
 
 
 
 
 
 
 
 
 
 
 
 
 
  Short track speed skating (10)
 
 
 
 
 
  Wheelchair basketball (1)

Schedule
The schedule for the 2011 Canada Games (19 February is a crossover day):

Venues
Canada Games Centre: artistic gymnastics, badminton, synchronized swimming
Canada Games Oval: long track speed skating
Citadel High School: wheelchair basketball, table tennis
Cole Harbour Place: ringette
Dartmouth Sportsplex: ice hockey
Halifax Forum: boxing
Halifax Metro Centre: ice hockey
Mayflower Curling Club: curling
Sackville High School: shooting, archery
St. Mary's University: squash, judo
Ski Martock: biathlon, cross-country skiing, snowboarding
Ski Wentworth: freestyle skiing, alpine skiing
St. Margaret's Centre: short track speed skating, figure skating

References

 
2011
2011
Canada Games, 2011
Canada Games, 2011
Canada Winter Games
Sport in Halifax, Nova Scotia
2011 in Nova Scotia